Annamari Dancs is a Romanian-Hungarian singer. She was born in Sfântu Gheorghe, Romania. Her father, Árpád, was a music teacher and later manager of Dancs Market Records. Her mother, Anna-Mária, was also a teacher and her older brother Zsolt is her concert manager and drummer of her band.

Career
After completing school in the music conservatory, Gheoghe Dima Academy of Music, in Cluj-Napoca, Romania, Dancs graduated as an opera singer. Over the past 10 years, she held multiple concerts as pop singer, not only in Romania and Hungary, but also a guest in Sweden, the United States, the Netherlands and Slovakia.

So far, she released nine record albums, seven maxi-albums, and three DVDs. She has fifteen video clips shot in different parts of the world, and she appeared this spring in a musical program on TVR 1, the Hungarian-language broadcast, Zenedoboz.

In 2011, she acquired Hungarian citizenship.

Recordings
Felhőkön is túl (1999)
Szívemben élsz (2001)
Erdélyi nosztalgia (2001)
Te vagy az egyetlen (2002)
Dancs Annamari 5 (2003)
Szerelem kell (2005)
Delicios (in Romanian; 2005)
Best Of (2006)
Egy a szívem , egy a párom (2007)
Live your life feat. DJ Robert Georgescu (2009)
Aha (Oneira) feat. DJ Robert Georgescu (2010)
Feel (2012) – Entry to the Hungarian National Final for the Eurovision Song Contest 2012

References

External links
Official site

1981 births
Romanian women pop singers
Romanian musicians of Hungarian descent
People from Sfântu Gheorghe
Living people
Hungarian pop singers
21st-century Hungarian women singers
21st-century Romanian women singers
21st-century Romanian singers